Tenjinzaka (天神坂) is a hill road that runs along the promontory through many districts of Takanawa. It crosses Sakurada Dori. It is said that this name given to the slope because of a small shrine dedicated to Sugawara no Michizane, a scholar who is venerated as the patron deity of scholarship, Tenjin. A Calyx field could be seen from this slope in the Edo period, therefore sometimes it is referred to as Yoshimizaka which also had a secondary meaning of "Good Luck" slope.

External links

Geography of Tokyo